WAKZ (95.9 FM, "Real 95.9") is a radio station licensed to Sharpsville, Pennsylvania, and serving Youngstown, Ohio. The station is owned by iHeartMedia, Inc. The station airs a mainstream urban radio format. Prior to July 2, 2020, WAKZ broadcast a contemporary hit radio format as "95.9 Kiss FM".

References

External links

AKZ
Mainstream urban radio stations in the United States
Radio stations established in 1976
1976 establishments in Pennsylvania
IHeartMedia radio stations
AKZ